Hennepin County is a county in the U.S. state of Minnesota. Its county seat is Minneapolis, the state's most populous city. The county is named in honor of the 17th-century explorer Father Louis Hennepin. The county extends from  Minneapolis to the suburbs and outlying cities in the western part of the county. The county’s natural areas are covered with extensive woods, hills, and lakes.

As of the 2020 census, the population was 1,281,565. It is the most populous county in Minnesota, and the 34th-most populous county in the United States; more than one in five Minnesotans live in Hennepin County. Hennepin County is included in the Minneapolis-St. Paul-Bloomington Metropolitan Statistical Area.

History
The Territorial Legislature of Minnesota established Hennepin County on March 6, 1852, and two years later Minneapolis was named the county seat. Father Louis Hennepin's name was chosen because he originally named Saint Anthony Falls and recorded some of the earliest accounts of the area for the Western world. In January 1855, the first bridge over the Mississippi River was built over St. Anthony Falls.

Water power built the City of Minneapolis and Hennepin County. The water of streams and rivers provided power to grist mills and saw mills throughout the county. By the late 1860s, more than a dozen mills were churning out lumber near St. Anthony Falls and the population of the county had surpassed 12,000.

In many ways, the power of the falls served as the vital link between the central city and the farmsteads scattered throughout the county. Farms produced vegetables, fruits, grains and dairy products for city dwellers, while Minneapolis industries, in turn, produced lumber, furniture, farm implements and clothing.

By 1883, railroads united Minneapolis with both the East and West coasts, and technical developments, especially in flour milling, brought rapid progress to the area. The major Minneapolis millers were Washburn, Pillsbury, Bell, Dunwoody and Crosby. For a decade, the “Mill City” was the flour-milling capital of the world and one of the largest lumber producers. Minneapolis, with a population of 165,000 by 1890, had become a major American city, and by 1900, was firmly established as the hub for the Upper Midwest’s industry and commerce.

Hennepin’s farm economy also was substantial. In 1910, farmland in Hennepin County totaled 284,000 acres, or about 72 percent of the county’s total area. The principal crops were wheat, corn, garden vegetables and apples. The number of acres in production remained at a high level for the next 30 years. However, by 1950, the amount of land devoted to agriculture had been reduced to 132,000 acres as development progressed in the suburbs.

During the 1950s and 1960s, many suburbs grew rapidly as housing developments, shopping centers, large school systems and growing industrialization had replaced much of the open farm land. By 1970, the suburban population of Hennepin County outnumbered that of the city for the first time. The population of Minneapolis actually declined by 10 percent from 1960 to 1970, while the suburban population grew by nearly 50 percent.

Another wave of immigration — which began after the Vietnam War in the mid-1970s — marked a major change in the ethnic makeup of the county’s immigrant populations. This wave peaked in the 1980s when hundreds of refugees from Southeast Asia, often aided by local churches, resettled in Hennepin. The population of Hennepin County surpassed the one-million mark in 1989.

Geography

Hennepin is one of 17 Minnesota counties with more savanna soils than either prairie or forest soils, and is one of only two Minnesota counties with more than 75% of its area in savanna soils (the other is Wright County).

The highest waterfall on the Mississippi River, the Saint Anthony Falls (discovered by Louis Hennepin) is in Hennepin County next to downtown Minneapolis, but in the 19th century, the falls were converted to a series of dams. Barges and boats now pass through locks to move between the parts of the river above and below the dams.

Adjacent counties
 Anoka County (northeast)
 Ramsey County (east)
 Dakota County (southeast)
 Scott County (south)
 Carver County (southwest)
 Wright County (northwest)
 Sherburne County (north)

National protected areas
 Minnesota Valley National Wildlife Refuge (part)
 Mississippi National River and Recreation Area (part)

Demographics

2020 census

2010
As of the 2010 Census, there were 1,152,425 people, 475,913 households, and 272,885 families living in the county. The racial makeup of the county was 74.4% White, 11.8% Black or African American, 0.9% Native American, 6.2% Asian, 3.4% from other races, and 3.2% from two or more races. 6.7% of the population were Hispanic or Latino of any race.

According to the 2010–2015 American Community Survey, the largest ancestry groups were German (26.3%), Norwegian (12.6%), Irish (10.8%), and Swedish (8.3%).

2000
At the 2000 Census, there were 1,116,200 people, 456,129 households, and 267,291 families living in the county. The population density was 774/km2 (2,005/mi2). There were 468,824 housing units at an average density of 325/km2 (842/mi2). The racial makeup of the county was 80.53% White, 8.95% Black or African American, 1.00% Native American, 4.80% Asian, 0.05% Pacific Islander, 2.06% from other races, and 2.60% from two or more races. 4.07% of the population were Hispanic or Latino of any race.

There were 456,129 households, out of which 28.80% had children under the age of 18 living with them, 45.30% were married couples living together, 9.90% had a female householder with no husband present, and 41.40% were non-families. 31.80% of all households were made up of individuals, and 8.40% had someone living alone who was 65 years of age or older. The average household size was 2.39 and the average family size was 3.07.

In the county 24.00% of the population was under the age of 18, 9.70% was between 18 and 24, 33.70% from 25 to 44, 21.70% from 45 to 64, and 11.00% were 65 years of age or older. The median age was 35 years. For every 100 females there were 97.00 males. For every 100 females age 18 and over, there were 94.70 males.

The median income for a household in the county was $51,711, and the median income for a family was $65,985 (these figures had risen to $60,115 and $79,970 respectively as of a 2007 estimate). Accounting for inflation, these figures rise again to $76,202.87 for individuals, and $92,353.46 for households, adjusted for 2014 dollars. Males had a median income of $42,466 versus $32,400 for females. The per capita income for the county was $28,789. About 5.00% of families and 8.30% of the population were below the poverty line, including 10.50% of those under age 18 and 5.90% of those age 65 or over.

Hennepin County is the wealthiest county in Minnesota and one of the 100 highest-income counties in the United States.

Besides English, languages with significant numbers of speakers in Hennepin County include Arabic, Hmong, Khmer, Lao, Russian, Somali, Spanish, and Vietnamese.

Religious statistics
In 2010 statistics, the largest religious group in Hennepin County was the Archdiocese of Saint Paul and Minneapolis, with 215,205 Catholics worshipping at 73 parishes, followed by 124,732 ELCA Lutherans with 106 congregations, 59,811 non-denominational adherents with 103 congregations, 20,286 UMC Methodists with 42 congregations, 18,836 Missouri Synod Lutherans with 34 congregations, 16,941 PC-USA Presbyterians with 21 congregations, 16,230 Converge Baptists with 26 congregations, 16,128 AoG Pentecostals with 32 congregations, 12,307 UCC Christians with 20 congregations, and 8,608 Reform Jews with 3 congregations. Altogether, 54.3% of the population was claimed as members by religious congregations, although members of historically African-American denominations were underrepresented due to incomplete information. In 2014, Hennepin County had 708 religious organizations, the 16th most out of all US counties.

Law and government

County Sheriff
The Hennepin County Sheriff manages the county jail, patrols waterways, provides security for the District Court, handles home foreclosures, participates in homeland security activities and in law enforcement, and by state law is responsible for handling applications for permits to carry a firearm for residents of Hennepin County. The current County Sheriff is Dawanna Witt, who was elected in 2022.

County Attorney
The Hennepin County Attorney sets policies and priorities for prosecuting criminal cases, oversees child protection and child support cases, and provides legal advice and representation to county government. The current County Attorney is Mary Moriarty, who was elected in 2022.

Commissioners
Like all counties in Minnesota, Hennepin is governed by an elected and nonpartisan board of commissioners. In Minnesota, county commissions usually have five members, but Hennepin, Ramsey, Dakota, Anoka and St Louis counties have seven members. Each commissioner represents a district of approximately equal population. In Hennepin the county commission appoints the medical examiner, county auditor-treasurer and county recorder. The sheriff and county attorney are also elected on a nonpartisan ticket. The county government's headquarters are in downtown Minneapolis in the Hennepin County Government Center. The county oversees the Hennepin County Library system (which merged with the Minneapolis Public Library system in 2008), and Hennepin County Medical Center. The county commission also elects a chair who presides at meetings.

Key staff
Hennepin County's normal operations are coordinated by the County Administrator David Hough, Assistant County Administrator for Human Services Jodi Wentland, Assistant County Administrator for Operations Dan Rogan, Assistant County Administrator for Public Works Lisa Cerney, Assistant County Administrator for Disparity Reduction May Xiong, and Assistant County Administrator for Public Safety Chela Guzman-Wiegert.

Politics
Like most urban counties nationwide, Hennepin County is a Democratic stronghold. It has voted Democratic in every election since 1964, except for 1972 when Richard Nixon won the county as part of a national landslide. In 2020, Joe Biden won 70% of the vote in the county, the largest percentage for any candidate since 1904.

At state level, the county is no less Democratic. For governorship and Senate, the last Republicans to win the county were Arne Carlson in 1994 and David Durenberger in 1988, respectively.

Transportation

Major highways

  Interstate 35W
  Interstate 94
  Interstate 394
  Interstate 494
  Interstate 694
  US Highway 12
  US Highway 52
  US Highway 169
  US Highway 212
  Minnesota State Highway 5
  Minnesota State Highway 7
  Minnesota State Highway 41
  Minnesota State Highway 47
  Minnesota State Highway 55
  Minnesota State Highway 62
  Minnesota State Highway 65
  Minnesota State Highway 77
  Minnesota State Highway 100
  Minnesota State Highway 101
  Minnesota State Highway 121
  Minnesota State Highway 252
  Minnesota State Highway 610
  Hennepin County Road 17 (France Avenue)
  Hennepin County Road 61
  Hennepin County Road 81
  Hennepin County Road 122
 Other county roads

Airports
 Minneapolis–Saint Paul International Airport (MSP) serves the Twin Cities area. It is the 17th-busiest airport in the United States by passenger traffic and serves as a hub for Delta Air Lines.
 Crystal Airport (MIC) is a public airport in Crystal.
 Flying Cloud Airport (FCM) is a public airport in Eden Prairie.

Economy

Major companies and employers
As the economic center of Minnesota and the Upper Midwest, Hennepin County is home to many major companies in a diverse section of industries. As of the 2018 estimate, there are twelve Fortune 500 companies headquartered in Hennepin County, five of which are located in Minneapolis.

Hennepin County is also home to several major private companies such as Carlson and Cargill, both located in Minnetonka, the latter of which is the largest privately owned company in the United States.

Along with these major companies, Hennepin County also contains several large employers, as listed below. According to the 2016 American Community Survey, the largest overall industries in Hennepin County are healthcare and social assistance (96,511 workers), manufacturing (80,324), and retail trade (75,861).

Economic indicators
According to the 2016 American Community Survey, the average household income in Hennepin County is $71,200. The GINI Index for 2016 was 0.461, lower than the national average of 0.485. As of 2016, nearly 132,000 residents of Hennepin County were living under the poverty line, 10.9% of the county population. This figure is lower than the national average of 14%.

Education

Tertiary education
Colleges and universities in the county include:
 Augsburg University in Minneapolis
 Dunwoody College of Technology in downtown Minneapolis
 Hamline University - Minneapolis campus in St. Louis Park
 Hennepin Technical College in Brooklyn Park and Eden Prairie
 Metropolitan State University in downtown Minneapolis and Brooklyn Park
 Minneapolis College of Art and Design in Minneapolis
 Minneapolis Community and Technical College in downtown Minneapolis
 Minnesota State University, Mankato - Twin Cities campus in Edina
 Normandale Community College in Bloomington
 North Central University in downtown Minneapolis
 North Hennepin Community College in Brooklyn Park
 Northwestern Health Sciences University in Bloomington
 St. Cloud State University - Twin Cities campus in Plymouth
 Saint Mary's University of Minnesota - Twin Cities campus in Minneapolis
 University of Minnesota - Twin Cities campus in Minneapolis
 University of St. Thomas - Minneapolis campus in downtown Minneapolis

K-12 education
School districts include:

 Anoka-Hennepin Public School District
 Bloomington Public School District
 Brooklyn Center School District
 Buffalo-Hanover-Montrose Public Schools
 Delano Public School District
 Edina Public School District
 Elk River School District
 Eden Prairie Public School District
 Hopkins Public School District
 Minneapolis Public School District
 Minnetonka Public School District
 Orono Public School District
 Osseo Public School District
 Richfield Public School District
 Robbinsdale Public School District
 Rockford Public School District
 St. Anthony-New Brighton Schools
 St. Louis Park Public School District
 Waconia Public School District
 Watertown-Mayer Public School District
 Wayzata Public School District
 Westonka Public School District

Public libraries
Hennepin County Library (which Minneapolis Public Library merged into)

Recreation

Parks
Hennepin County, and in particular the city of Minneapolis, is renowned for its expansive and high-quality park system. The Minneapolis park system has been called the best-designed, best-financed, and best-maintained in America. The Minneapolis park system has been named the top park system in the country by the Trust for Public Land for five consecutive years as of 2017. Many of the Minneapolis' numerous parks are linked by the Grand Rounds National Scenic Byway, a series of interconnected parks and paths in the city that extends for 51 miles. The byway is divided into seven districts: Downtown Riverfront, Mississippi River, Minnehaha, Chain of Lakes, Theodore Wirth, Victory Memorial, and Northeast. The byway includes many major destinations in Minneapolis, including Nicollet Island, St. Anthony Falls, Stone Arch Bridge, Mill Ruins Park, Mississippi National River and Recreation Area, Minnehaha Creek, Minnehaha Park, Lake Hiawatha, Lake Nokomis, Lake Harriet, Bde Maka Ska, Lake of the Isles, Cedar Lake, and Theodore Wirth Park.

Outside of Minneapolis, Hennepin County is part of the Three Rivers Park District, a park system containing 20 parks and 10 trails spanning the Twin Cities metro area.

Culture

Numerous art institutions in Minneapolis make Hennepin County a national center for the arts. It contains some of the largest and most well-known centers for art in the country, including the Minneapolis Institute of Art, Walker Art Center, Weisman Art Museum, and the Minneapolis Sculpture Garden. Major art centers include Northeast Minneapolis and the Minneapolis neighborhood of North Loop. Minneapolis is home to many important artist organizations such as the Traffic Zone Center for Visual Art, the Handicraft Guild, and the Northeast Minneapolis Arts Association.

Hennepin County is also home to a thriving theater scene, highlighted by the Guthrie Theater, located in downtown Minneapolis. It is home to many theater companies such as Mixed Blood, Skewed Visions, Brave New Workshop, and Children's Theatre Company. Other notable theaters include the Orpheum Theatre, the State Theatre, and the Pantages Theatre. Additionally, many other cities in Hennepin County are home to local community theaters, such as Eden Prairie, Minnetonka, Orono, Osseo, and Plymouth.

Sports
Of the "Big Four" sports leagues in the US, three are located in Minneapolis: the Minnesota Twins play in Target Field, the Minnesota Timberwolves play in Target Center, and the Minnesota Vikings play in U.S. Bank Stadium. Additionally, among major sports leagues, the Minnesota Lynx also play in Target Center.

Cities

 Bloomington
 Brooklyn Center
 Brooklyn Park
 Champlin
 Chanhassen (partial) 
 Corcoran
 Crystal
 Dayton (partial)
 Deephaven
 Eden Prairie
 Edina
 Excelsior
 Golden Valley
 Greenfield
 Greenwood
 Hanover (partial)
 Hopkins
 Independence
 Long Lake
 Loretto
 Maple Grove
 Maple Plain
 Medicine Lake
 Medina
 Minneapolis (county seat and largest municipality)
 Minnetonka
 Minnetonka Beach
 Minnetrista
 Mound
 New Hope
 Orono
 Osseo
 Plymouth
 Richfield
 Robbinsdale
 Rockford (partial)
 Rogers
 Shorewood
 Spring Park
 St. Anthony (partial)
 St. Bonifacius
 St. Louis Park
 Tonka Bay
 Wayzata
 Woodland

Unorganized territory
 Fort Snelling

See also

 National Register of Historic Places listings in Hennepin County, Minnesota

References

External links

 
 Hennepin County Library website
 Bloomington Convention & Visitors Bureau
 Minneapolis Northwest Convention & Visitors Bureau

 
Minneapolis–Saint Paul
Minnesota counties
Minnesota counties on the Mississippi River
1852 establishments in Minnesota Territory
Populated places established in 1852